William Komenich (July 1, 1916 – March 8, 1961) was an American professional basketball player. He played for the Oshkosh All-Stars in the National Basketball League for three seasons and averaged 2.9 points per game. He won the NBL championship in 1941–42. 

Bill's brother was Milo Komenich, who also played in the NBL.

References

1916 births
1961 deaths
American men's basketball players
Basketball players from Gary, Indiana
Guards (basketball)
Forwards (basketball)
Marquette Golden Eagles men's basketball players
Oshkosh All-Stars players